Barno Iskhakova (12 May 1927 - 7 September 2001; , ,) was a Soviet and Bukharian Jewish musician from Tajikistan.

Early life
Iskhakova was born in Tashkent, Uzbek SSR to the traditional Bukharian Jewish family of Berakh and Rachel Iskhakov.

Career

From 1941 to 1943 she worked as a librarian at the Tashkent Secondary School No. 24, and between 1943 and 1945 as a singer for the choir of the Radio of the Uzbek SSR. She is the first woman to become a professional Shashmaqam singer. After World War 2, she and her husband immigrated to Stalinabad (Dushanbe) and made her career as a singer there, working since 1950 as a soloist of the Radio Department of the Tajik SSR. Barno Iskhakova was considered one of the greatest modern female singers in the history of Central Asia and Tajikistan. She was married to singer Isroel Badalbayev, although she retained her original surname as a stage name. 

Her first song — "Allah" won an award in the National Review. She is considered a remarkable performer, in the same class as other Tajik stars as Seeno, Davlatmand Kholov, and Daler Nazarov. Iskhakova became was very famous for her rendition of traditional Shashmaqam songs in Tajik and Uzbek, and other songs in Russian, as well as her mother tongue of Bukhori (Judeo-Tajik Language). She was known as the Queen of the Shashmaqam tradition of Tajik music, she sang side by side on the radio and television with other famous performers of the Tajik Soviet Era such as Neriyo Aminov, Rafael Tolmasov, Shoista Mullojonova, Hanifa Mavlianova, Rena Galibova, Ahmad Boboqulov, and others. Her repertoire consisted of more than 100 songs.

Since 1980, Iskhakova worked also as a senior teacher of the Oriental Music Department of the Tajik State Institute of Arts in Dushanbe.  When Soviet Tajik writer Sadriddin Ayni heard her sing, he called her "Levicha among women" for Levi (Levicha) Babakhanov was a famous Bukharian Jewish traditional singer who performed for the last Emir of Bukhara in the early 20th century. The Tajik folk singer and rubab player Jurabek Nabiev has said he was inspired to pursue a professional career after listening to Iskhakova, who was his teacher.

She took part in the recording of the entire series "Shashmaqam", which is stored in the National Music Archives of Tajikistan.

Awards and honors
She won the State Rudaki Prize of the Tajik SSR, the Order of the Red Banner of Labour, and the Order of the Badge of Honour as well as Honored and People's Artist of the Tajik SSR.

Family
Barno Ishakova and Isroel Badalbayev had five children: Sofia, Olga, Tamara, Bertha, and Roman. Her daughter Sofia Badalbayeva lives in Israel and is also a Shashmaqam singer.

Later life
She immigrated to Israel with her family in 1992 due to the Civil War in Tajikistan, and the rise of Islamic Fundamentalism following the collapse of the USSR and died on 7 September 2001 in Ramla, Israel.

She, along with her husband Isroel, are buried at the Har HaMenuchot Cemetery in Jerusalem.

Legacy
In May 2017, the city of Petah Tikva named a street for her.

See also
 Turkestan
 Uzbekistan
 Bukhara
 Bukharan Jews
 Shashmaqam

References

 Broughton, Simon and Sultanova, Razia "Bards of the Golden Road" c. 2000

1927 births
2001 deaths
20th-century Israeli women singers
20th-century Tajikistani women singers
20th-century Uzbekistani women singers
Musicians from Tashkent
People's Artists of Tajikistan
Recipients of the Order of the Red Banner of Labour
Bukharan Jews
Russian-language singers
Tajik-language singers
Soviet Jews
Soviet women singers
Tajikistani emigrants to Israel
Tajikistani people of Uzbek descent
Tajikistani women singers
Uzbekistani emigrants to Israel
Burials at Har HaMenuchot